The Nepal Intermodal Transport Development Board (NITDB) was formed by the government of Nepal in 2054 BS (1997 AD) to oversee the economical and efficient management of Inland Clearance Depots (ICDs) for facilitation of Nepal's foreign trade. There are three ICDs in Nepal which operate under the NITDB.
 
 Birgunj Inland Dry Port
 Biratnagar Inland Dry Port
 Bhairahwa Inland Dry Port
Integrated Check Post (ICP), Birgunj

References

Government agencies of Nepal
Foreign trade of Nepal
1997 establishments in Nepal